CQ VHF was a magazine that served the ham radio operators  whose operational and technical interests lie above 50 MHz.

The magazine focused on radio technology, products, and activities that exist on 6 meters, 2 meters, 440 MHz and above. CQ VHF covered a broad range of skill levels, from the new Technician to the Extra Class microwave experimenter, and included operating, technical and construction articles.

CQ VHF was published by CQ Communications, publishers of CQ Amateur Radio magazine, WorldRadio magazine, and Popular Communications magazine.

In late December 2013 CQ Communications announced that they would cease publication of the printed version of CQ VHF Magazine and Popular Communications. These two magazines were combined with WorldRadio in a single digital publication called CQ Plus starting in February 2014.

References

External links
 CQ-VHF article index

Amateur radio magazines
Defunct magazines published in the United States
Hobby magazines published in the United States
Magazines established in 1996
Magazines disestablished in 2013
Magazines published in New York (state)
Quarterly magazines published in the United States

pl:CQ Amateur Radio